Llangollen Canal Museum is a Grade II listed building in Llangollen.

Listed by Cadw (Reference Number 1225) and thought to have been built between 1804 and 1808, it was originally a single storey warehouse but was later heightened to two stories and extended in red brick.

Despite its name, it is no longer a museum and is not open to the public.

References

Llangollen Canal
Llangollen
Grade II listed buildings in Denbighshire